James Lumsden may refer to:
 James Lumsden (military officer), Scottish soldier who served in the Swedish army
 James Lumsden (Lord Provost) (1778–1856), Scottish stationer and Lord Provost of Glasgow
 Sir James Lumsden (1808–1879), Scottish stationer and Lord Provost of Glasgow
 Jimmy Lumsden, Scottish footballer